49th Regiment or 49th Infantry Regiment may refer to:

 49th Hutsul Rifle Regiment, a unit of the Polish Army 
 49th (Princess Charlotte of Wales's) (Hertfordshire) Regiment of Foot, a unit of the British Army 
 49th Royal Tank Regiment, a unit of the British Army 
 49th Field Artillery Regiment, RCA, a unit of the Canadian Army
 The Hastings and Prince Edward Regiment, a unit of the Canadian Army
 49th Field Artillery Regiment (United States), a unit of the US Army
 49th Infantry Regiment (United States), a unit of the US Army
 49th Regiment of Bengal Native Infantry, a unit of the East India Company's Bengal Army

 American Civil War regiments 
Union (Northern) Army
 49th Regiment Kentucky Volunteer Mounted Infantry
 49th Illinois Volunteer Infantry Regiment
 49th Wisconsin Volunteer Infantry Regiment
 49th Indiana Infantry Regiment
 49th New York Volunteer Infantry
 49th Ohio Infantry
 49th Pennsylvania Infantry

Confederate (Southern) Army
49th North Carolina Infantry
49th Virginia Infantry

See also
 49th Division (disambiguation)
 49th Brigade (disambiguation)
 49th Squadron (disambiguation)